The Mohammed Bin Rashid Library (MBR) is a large library in the Al Jaddaf locality of Dubai, United Arab Emirates, on Dubai Creek that opened to the public on June 16, 2022

Overview
The design of the library is inspired by the shape of a lectern. The main features of this library will be a conference centre, exhibition spaces, a children's library, a bookshop on the ground floor, reading halls, service areas, a business library, and training halls. The basement of the library will be able to accommodate around a thousand cars.

The project took over 6 years to complete at a cost of AED1 billion.  300,000 to 400,000 volumes will be available in the library's open-access section. The library will have book handling and information systems. The library has been designed by consortium of 'asp' Architekten Stuttgart, Obermeyer Planen+Beraten Munich, and the ACG Architecture Consulting Group. The structural design of the library and its foundation system was awarded from ACG to S. A. MIRO, INC. for their experience in designing complicated structures similar to the library. The project's main contractor was ASGC Construction, a Dubai-based construction group.

History
Sheikh Mohammed Bin Rashid Al Maktoum announced the conception of the library in February 2016, the "Year of Reading" in Dubai. Designed in the shape of an open book on a lectern, the seven-story library will cover 650,000 square feet of property and is expected to facilitate 9 million visitors annually. The Mohammed Bin Rashid Library will house over 4.5 million printed, digital, and audio books. The AED1 billion contract for the construction for the Mohammed Bin Rashid Library is the largest cultural project in Dubai. Construction began in September 2016, to be completed by mid-2018. As of December 2017, the construction of the library was 22% completed. In 2018 it was 72% complete.

The library was due to open in 2018 but was still under construction in 2019. As of February 2020, the facade was complete, the main structure was topped out, and the interior in late stages of development. The library was opened to public on the 16th of June, 2022 and hosted a meeting of the Dubai Executive Council on the 23rd of June 2022.

Services
The library encompasses eight specialized collections, including an information centre, a media centre, an Arabic library, an international library, a public library, a business library, a youth library, a children's library, a family library, and a reading corner. Furthermore, the library will include a center for conservation and preservation of books, manuscripts, and documents as well as a special library for the Al Maktoum Collection. The library is expecting to host over 100 cultural and intellectual events every year along with a permanent art gallery. The inclusion of a Civilization museum and an Arab Heritage Museum will allow people to embrace their Arab identity through heritage preservation initiatives.  The library includes a 500-seat theatre for lectures and seminars for launching intellectual and cultural events regionally and globally.

The MBR Library will have modern technology to serve scientific research and dissemination of knowledge. Hussein Nasser Lootah, Director-General of Dubai Municipality, has stated that the MBR Library will be a "world accredited reference in Arabic language and a destination for specialists, scientists, writers, poets, intellectuals, talented minds, and students. It will also serve as an incubation for publishers."

The nearest Dubai Metro station is Creek on the Green Line with a shaded path under construction to link with the library.

See also
 Al Ras Public Library, Dubai's oldest public library
 Dubai Public Library, with a number of branches around Dubai

References

National libraries
Libraries in Dubai
Library buildings completed in 2022
Tourist attractions in Dubai
2022 establishments in the United Arab Emirates